The Zhongxing railway station is a railway station of Shenyang–Dandong railway. The station is located in Fengcheng, Liaoning, China.

References 
The information in this article is based on that in its Chinese equivalent.

Railway stations in Liaoning
Railway stations in China opened in 1943